The Kansas Cowboy Hall of Fame, is located at the Boot Hill Museum in Dodge City, Kansas. The first inductees were selected in 2002.

References

External links
Kansas Cowboy Hall of Fame website
Kansas Cowboy Hall of Fame History at KU Kansas Heritage

Cowboy halls of fame
Halls of fame in Kansas
State halls of fame in the United States
Rural history museums in Kansas
Museums in Ford County, Kansas
Buildings and structures in Dodge City, Kansas